The Sandover River is an ephemeral river in the Northern Territory of Australia located in northeast Central Australia. It is the only major tributary of the Georgina River that does not rise in western Queensland. Instead it flows from the eastern Macdonnell Ranges, northward to enter the Georgina near Urandangi.

Course and features
The ephemeral Sandover River is usually dry except when the northern monsoon moves unusually far south into the continent. Most of this rain falls in the summer: between December and March monthly totals have on several occasions exceeded the mean annual rainfall. Flows in the Sandover often fail to reach the Georgina, instead drying out in waterholes well west of Urandangie. However, in very wet periods, such as 1920–1921, 1973-1977 and 1999–2001, water from the Sandover may not only reach the Georgina, but actually flow (via a circuitous route) into Lake Eyre in South Australia.

The river is reported as passing through the localities of Costello and Sandover.  Both the Sandover Highway and the Sandover Stock Route are named after the river because their respective alignment follow that of the river.

History
The river was named in 1878 after  William Sandover, the then President of the Legislative Council of South Australia, reportedly by the explorer and botanist. Charles Winnecke.

See also

List of rivers of Northern Territory
Sandover Highway

References

External links

Sandover